David Ritchie or Dave Ritchie may refer to:

David Ritchie (cricketer) (1892–1974), English cricketer
David Ritchie (diplomat), Australian diplomat
David Ritchie (footballer) (born 1971), former English footballer
David Ritchie (moderator) (1763–1844), moderator of the General Assembly of the Church of Scotland, 1814/15
David Ritchie (politician) (1812–1867), Republican member of the U.S. House of Representatives
David Ritchie (surgeon) (1920–1993), British doctor
David Edward Ritchie, chairman of Vancouver-based Ritchie Bros. Auctioneers
David George Ritchie (1853–1903), Scottish philosopher
David J. Ritchie (1950–2009), game designer and author
David "Tarzan" Ritchie (born 1945), shinty player
Dave Ritchie (Canadian football) (born c. 1930), coach in the Canadian Football League
Dave Ritchie (footballer) (born 1935), Australian rules footballer
Dave Ritchie (ice hockey) (1892–1973), ice hockey player
Black Dwarf (personage) (1740–1811), born as David Ritchie, a dwarf, the inspiration for Sir Walter Scott's novel The Black Dwarf